In the history of the courts of England and Wales, the Court for Divorce and Matrimonial Causes was created by the Matrimonial Causes Act 1857, which transferred the jurisdiction of the ecclesiastical courts in matters matrimonial to the new court so created.

The Judge Ordinary of the Court for Divorce and Matrimonial Causes also presided over the Court of Probate, but the two courts remained separate entities.

On 1 November 1875, under the Supreme Court of Judicature Act 1873 and the Supreme Court of Judicature Act 1875, the Judge Ordinary of the Court for Divorce and Matrimonial Causes was transferred, as its President, to the Probate, Divorce and Admiralty Division of the High Court of Justice.

Judges ordinary of the Court for Divorce and Matrimonial Causes

 6 January 1858: Sir Cresswell Cresswell
 26 August 1863: Sir James Plaisted Wilde (ennobled as Lord Penzance from 6 April 1869)
 14 November 1872: Sir James Hannen

References
Robert Albion Pritchard, W Tarn Pritchard and John George Witt. A Digest of the Law and Practice of the Court for Divorce & Matrimonial Causes, and Appeals from that Court. Third Edition. Shaw and Sons. London. 1874. Google Books.
George Browne. A Treatise on the Principles and Practice of the Court for Divorce and Matrimonial Causes. 1864. Second Edition. 1868. Third Edition. 1876. Fourth Edition. 1880. Bibliographic details: British Museum Library Catalogue Monthly Legal Advertiser.
Joseph Haydn and Horace Ockerby, The Book of Dignities, W.H. Allen & Co., 1894

Courts and tribunals established in 1957
1875 disestablishments in the United Kingdom
Former courts and tribunals in England and Wales
1857 establishments in the United Kingdom
Family courts
Courts and tribunals disestablished in 1875